Christian Oliver Ivan Glanzmann (born 26 May 1975) is a Swiss musician, singer, songwriter and record producer, best known as the male lead vocalist of Swiss folk metal band Eluveitie. He also plays mandola, whistles, and bagpipes in Branâ Keternâ.

Early life
Glanzmann was born on 26 May 1975 in Basel, Switzerland.

Equipment
Throat/Shure SM58
Mandola (Koch)
Tin & low whistles (Karavev & Burkes)
Electric bagpipes (Redpipes)
Gaita
Acoustic guitar
Bodhrán
Audix Microphones

Discography

With Eluveitie

Studio albums 
Spirit (2006)
Slania (2008)
Evocation I: The Arcane Dominion (2009)
Everything Remains (As It Never Was) (2010)
Helvetios (2012)
Origins (2014)
Evocation II: Pantheon (2017)
Ategnatos (2019)

With Branâ Keternâ
vJod

With Môr Cylch
Craic

Guest appearances
Folkearth – I
Roy – Anthems
Amorphis – Under the Red Cloud
Amorphis – Queen of Time
Illumishade – Tales of Time

External links
 Interview with Eluveitie mastermind Chrigel Glanzmann
 Eluveitie interview - a conversation with guitarist Chrigel Glanzmann

1975 births
Living people
21st-century Swiss  male singers
Bodhrán players
Swiss heavy metal musicians
Swiss heavy metal singers